Joy Manikya II (died 1746) was the Maharaja of Tripura during the mid-18th-century. He originally gained the throne through popular approval for his military hostility to the Mughal Empire. However, Joy spent much of his reign warring against various relations to maintain his grip on it, in particular with his cousin Indra Manikya II.

Background
Originally named Rudramani Thakur, he belonged to a cadet branch of the royal family; his father Haradhan Thakur had been a grandson of Jagannath Thakur, the younger brother of Maharaja Govinda Manikya.

As a young man, Rudramani had been a prominent general and had opposed the suzerainty of the Mughal Empire over Tripura. To this end, he aimed to form a national militia against the occupying force. From his base in the Matia Hills (where he had been sent to capture elephants), Rudramani organised a strong force with the aid of tribal chiefs. He wrote to the then-monarch, Mukunda Manikya, stating that the people of Tripura were opposed to the Mughals and that if the latter gave his approval, Rudramani could arrange to have the Faujdar at Udaipur, Haji Munsam, and his men killed. Mukunda disavowed the proposal, instead opting to inform Munsam of the conspiracy.

Reign

In 1739, Mukunda Manikya committed suicide, having been arrested by the Mughals on the grounds of neglecting to pay his tribute of elephants. In response, Rudramani launched a surprise assault on Udaipur and occupied it, with the Mughals, having been caught off guard, coming to terms and surrendering the city. His actions were popular among the Tripuri people, who selected him to be the new monarch as opposed to Mukunda's sons. Rudramani subsequently ascended the throne with the regnal name Joy Manikya.

In 1744, Panch Cowrie Thakur, a son of Mukunda living in the Mughal viceregal capital Murshidabad, approached the Nawab of Bengal, Alivardi Khan, for aid in wresting Tripura from Joy. The Mughals, still sore from their previous defeat, provided military support to Panch Cowrie, who was able to take the throne and assumed the name Indra Manikya. Joy withdrew from the capital and ran a parallel government from the Matia Hills. With the support of influential Zamindars, he made repeated attempts to reclaim full power, though was always held back by Mughal forces. The country remained divided between the partisans of the rival monarchs for a time before Joy was able to gain the support of the Mughals and retake the throne.

It was during this time that another relative, a son of Dharma Manikya II, taking advantage of the internal divisions, made his own claim for power. He bribed the Naib Nazim of Dhaka and arrived in Comilla with a strong Muslim army, assuming the name Udai Manikya. Joy was able to resist this enemy, forcing Udai into submission and driving him out. However, he now fell into arrears with his tribute to the Mughals. A military expedition was dispatched against Joy, which defeated him in an ensuing battle. He was taken to the Court of Murshidabad and arrested alongside his dignitaries, with Indra Manikya once more taking his place as ruler of Tripura.

By 1746, Joy had received control of the kingdom for a third time after Indra had fallen into disfavour with the Nawab. However, his remaining time on the throne was very brief, with much of it being troubled by Indra's younger brother Krishnamani. Following Joy's death that same year, he was succeeded by his younger brother Vijaya Manikya III.

References

Kings of Tripura
History of Tripura
Dethroned monarchs
1746 deaths
Year of birth unknown